Ctenotus burbidgei, also known commonly as the plain-backed Kimberley ctenotus,  is a species of skink, a lizard in the family Scincidae. The species is native to Western Australia.

Etymology
The specific name, burbidgei, is in honor of Australian zoologist Andrew A. Burbidge.

Habitat
The preferred natural habitats of C. burbidgei are shrubland and savanna.

Reproduction
C. burbidgei is oviparous

References

Further reading
Cogger HG (2014). Reptiles and Amphibians of Australia, Seventh Edition. Clayton, Victoria, Australia: CSIRO Publishing. xxx + 1,033 pp. .
Storr GM (1975). "The Genus Ctenotus (Lacertilia, Scincidae) in the Kimberley and North-west Divisions of Western Australia". Records of the Western Australia Museum 3 (3): 209–243. (Ctenotus mastigura burbidgei, new subspecies, p. 228–229).
Wilson, Steve; Swan, Gerry (2013). A Complete Guide to Reptiles of Australia, Fourth Edition. Sydney: New Holland Publishers. 522 pp. .

burbidgei
Reptiles described in 1975
Taxa named by Glen Milton Storr